The 1951 Titleholders Championship was contested from March 15–18 at Augusta Country Club. It was the 12th edition of the Titleholders Championship.

This event was won by Pat O'Sullivan.

Final leaderboard

External links
Schenectady Gazette source

Titleholders Championship
Golf in Georgia (U.S. state)
Titleholders Championship
Titleholders Championship
Titleholders Championship
Titleholders Championship
Women's sports in Georgia (U.S. state)